The 2020–21 AEK B.C. season is AEK's 64th season in the top-tier level Greek Basket League. AEK is competing in four different competitions during the season.

Transfers 2020–21

Players In 

|}

Players Out 

|}

Friendlies

Competitions

Overall

Overview

Greek League

League table

Results summary

Results by round

Regular season

Results overview

Quarterfinals

Semifinals

Consolation finals

Greek Cup

 Quarterfinals

Greek Super Cup

 Final-4

FIBA Champions League

Regular season - Group C

Results summary

Results by round

Regular season

Results overview

Playoffs - Group K

Results summary

Results by round

Playoffs

Results overview

References

AEK B.C. seasons
2020–21 in European basketball by club
2020–21 Basketball Champions League